Yona is a town in the Bana Department of Balé Province in south-western Burkina Faso. The town has a population of 2037.

References

External links
Satellite map at Maplandia.com

Populated places in the Boucle du Mouhoun Region
Balé Province